Perry M. Rein and Georgia McCreery are an American writing team and producing team. They are best known for their work on the sitcoms Friends and Wizards of Waverly Place.

Their other television credits include Becker, Married to the Kellys, Nikki, Lab Rats, See Dad Run, Haters Back Off, and Knight Squad.

In 2012, the duo won a Primetime Emmy Award for their work on Wizards of Waverly Place, as a part of the producing and writing team. They served as showrunners for the Netflix series Haters Back Off.

References

External links

American television producers
American television writers
Living people
Primetime Emmy Award winners
Screenwriting duos
American women television writers
Place of birth missing (living people)
Year of birth missing (living people)
American women television producers
21st-century American women